Wojciech Onsorge (born 13 April 1994 in Poznań) is a Polish footballer who plays as a centre-back for Lech Poznań II.

Biography

Playing career
He began his career at a club in Mosina before coming through the ranks at Warta Poznań. He spent his career at Warta until February 2019, when he moved to Elana Toruń. He then went on to play half-a-season with Polonia Środa Wielkopolska in 2020 before joining Lech Poznań's reserve team on 6 February 2021. As an experienced player, his role was to help and mentor the youth and work towards a coaching licence.

Illness
In June 2021, Onsorge fell gravely ill and underwent a head MRI scan; he was subsequently diagnosed with an inoperable brain tumour, specifically in the parietal lobe. In order to help fight the life-threatening situation, a fundraiser for his medical costs was started, promoted by both Poznań clubs and the people associated with them.

References

External links

1994 births
Living people
Footballers from Poznań
Polish footballers
Association football defenders
Lech Poznań players
Warta Poznań players
Elana Toruń players
Polonia Środa Wielkopolska players
Lech Poznań II players 
I liga players
II liga players
III liga players
IV liga players